NYGH may refer to:

 Nanyang Girls' High School in Singapore
 North York General Hospital in Canada